Larne High School is a secondary school in Larne, County Antrim, Northern Ireland.

The foundation stone on the High School site was laid on 26 July 1955, and the school opened in September 1957. It was then known as Greenland Intermediate Secondary School and was the first of its type in County Antrim. It had just over five hundred pupils and a staff of forty. Today pupils range from the age of eleven to eighteen, and can sit exams at Key Stage 3, GCSE, GNVQ and A-level.

Curriculum

Students study 3 subjects at AS and A2 Level.

Bold subjects are taught at Larne Grammar School, with students having to achieve at least an A Grade at GCSE to be considered, in accordance with Larne Grammar School admissions policies.

References

External links
Home page

Secondary schools in County Antrim
Schools in Larne
Educational institutions established in 1957
1957 establishments in Northern Ireland